Za co? is a Polish historical film. It was released in 1995. It is based on the short story What For? by Leo Tolstoy published in 1906.

Za co? / Why?, prod. Poland-Russia; based on a story by Leo Tolstoy - screenplay with Pawel Fin, Valeri Pendrakovsky and Alexander Bondarev, directed by Jerzy Kawalerowicz. The dramatic story of a Polish nobleman who is arrested and sentenced to penal servitude for taking part in the November Uprising of 1830.

References

External links
 

1995 films
Polish historical films
Films directed by Jerzy Kawalerowicz
Russian multilingual films
Polish multilingual films
1990s historical films
1990s multilingual films